Abacetus basilewskyi is a species of ground beetle in the subfamily Pterostichinae. It was described by Straneo in 1948 and is an endemic species found in Mozambique.

References

Endemic fauna of Mozambique
basilewskyi
Beetles described in 1948
Insects of Southern Africa